Grecia is a canton in the Alajuela province of Costa Rica.

Toponymy
It is named after the country of Greece.

History 
Grecia was created on 27 July 1867 by decree 20.

Geography 
Grecia has an area of  km² and a mean elevation of  metres.

The canton lies among ridges and valleys on the southwestern slope of Poas Volcano. One area was completely separated from the remainder of the canton by the Cordillera Central (Central Mountain Range). Known as Río Cuarto, this area lies on the Caribbean Plain, it was a district of Grecia, but became a canton in 2018.

The Poás River and the Prendes River establish a large portion of the eastern border of the elongated canton, with the Sarchí River serving the same purpose on its western edge. The Grande River is the southern border.

Districts 
The canton of Grecia is subdivided into the following districts:
 Grecia
 San Isidro
 San José
 San Roque
 Tacares

Demographics 

For the 2011 census, Grecia had a population of  inhabitants.

Transportation

Road transportation 
The canton is covered by the following road routes:

See also 
 Grecia (toucan)

References 

Cantons of Alajuela Province
Populated places in Alajuela Province